Paul Ramfangzauva (born 26 March 1999) is an Indian footballer who plays as a central midfielder for Indian Super League club Odisha.

Club career
Born in Mizoram, India Paul made his senior debut with I-League side Aizawl, in the 2018–19 season. He earlier was the part of the Aizawl F.C. U-18. On 24 June 2020 he joined Indian Super League club Odisha.

Career statistics

Club

References

External links

1999 births
Living people
Footballers from Mizoram
Association football defenders
I-League players
Indian footballers
Aizawl FC players
Indian Super League players
Odisha FC players